Cathal or Cahal is a common given name in Ireland, spelled the same in both the Irish and English languages. The name is derived from two Celtic elements: the first, cath, means "battle"; the second element, val, means "rule". There is no feminine form of Cathal. The Gaelic name has several Anglicised forms, such as Cathel, Cahal, Cahill and Kathel. It has also been Anglicised as Charles, although this name is of an entirely different origin as it is derived from a Germanic element, karl, meaning "free man".

As is evident from the list below, the name was in medieval times most popular in Ireland's two western provinces, Munster and Connacht.

People with the name

Pre-19th century

St. Cathal of Taranto (d. 685), archbishop
Cathal mac Áedo (d. 627), king of Munster
Cathal Cú-cen-máthair (d. 665), king of Munster
Cathal mac Muiredaig (d. 735), king of Connacht
Cathal mac Finguine (d. 742), king of Munster
Cathal mac Murchadh (d. 816), king of Uí Maine
Cathal mac Conchobair (d. 925), king of Connacht
Cathal mac Tadg (d. 973), king of Connacht
Cathal mac Donnubáin (fl. 1014), king of Uí Chairpre Áebda
Cathal Crobhdearg Ua Conchobair (d. 1224), king of Connacht
Cathal mac Conchobair Ruadh Ua Conchobair (d. 1288), king of Connacht
Cathal mac Domhnall Ua Conchobair (d. 1324), king of Connacht
Cathal Óg Mac Maghnusa (d. 1498), main compiler of the Annals of Ulster
Cathal Buí Mac Giolla Ghunna (d. 1756), poet

Later

Cathal Barrett (born 21 July 1993) is an Irish hurler who plays for Tipperary 
Cathal Berry, is an Irish Independent politician, former Irish Army officer and medical doctor who has been a Teachta Dála (TD) for the Kildare South 
Cathal Black, is an Irish film director, writer, and producer
Cathal Breslin (b. 1978), concert pianist from Northern Ireland
Cathal Brugha (d. 1922), revolutionary
Cahal Carvill (born 22 April 1987) is a Northern Irish hurler 
Cathal Coughlan (musician) (born 16 December 1960), singer and musician with the bands Microdisney and the Fatima Mansions
Cathal Casey (born 4 September 1967) is an Irish retired hurler
Cathal Corey, Gaelic football manager and former player
Cathal Crowe, (born 1 October 1982) is an Irish Fianna Fáil politician
Cahal Daly (1917–2009), Roman Catholic Archbishop of Armagh and Primate of All Ireland from 1990 to 1996
Cathal Daniels (born 13 September 1996) is an Irish eventing rider.
Cathal J. Dodd (b. 1956), singer and voice actor
Cathal Dunbar (born 1996) is an Irish hurler who plays for Wexford Senior Championship 
Cathal Dunne (b. 1951), singer, represented Ireland in Eurovision Song Contest 1979
Cathal Gannon (1 August 1910 – 23 May 1999), was an Irish harpsichord maker, a fortepiano restorer and an amateur horologist 
Cathal Óg Greene (born 1987) is a Gaelic footballer for London.
Cathal Hayden is a Northern Irish fiddle and banjo player of note.
Cathal Magee (born 1954) was the Chief Executive Officer of the Health Service Executive (HSE) in Ireland from 2010 to 2012.
Cathal Mannion (born 22 October 1994) is an Irish hurler who plays for Galway Senior Championship 
Cathal Mac Coille (born 1952) is a retired Irish broadcaster, researcher and journalist
Cathal MacSwiney Brugha (born 13 January 1949) is an Irish decision scientist, the Emeritus Professor of Decision Analytics at University College Dublin's College of Business.
Cathal McCabe (born 1963 in County Down, Northern Ireland)
Cathal McCarron, is an All Ireland Winning Gaelic footballer for Tyrone. 
Cathal McConnell (born 1944) is a musician and singer 
Cathal McInerney, is an Irish sportsperson.
Cathal Naughton (born 3 July 1987) is an Irish retired hurler who played for Cork Senior Championship 
Cathal Kelly, is a Canadian writer
Cathal O'Connell, is an Irish hurler who plays as a forward for the Clare senior team.
Cathal Ó Murchadha, born Charles Murphy (16 February 1880 – 28 April 1958) was an Irish politician and republican
Cathal Ó Searcaigh (b. 1956), poet
Cathal Ó Sándair, born Charles Saunders was one of the most prolific Irish language authors of the 20th century
Cathal O'Shannon (23 August 1928 – 22 October 2011)[1] was an Irish journalist and television presenter
Cathal Parlon plays his Senior Club Hurling with Coolderry in Offaly.
Cathal Pendred (b. 1987), retired mixed martial artist*
Cathal Ryan is a Gaelic footballer from County Laois.
Cathal Smyth  (b. 1959), singer and songwriter, better known as Chas Smash of the British band Madness

Places

Cathal Brugha Street, is a street on the northside of Dublin, Ireland.
Cathal Brugha Barracks, is an Irish Army barracks in Rathmines, Dublin

See also
List of Irish-language given names
Cadwallon (disambiguation)

References

Irish-language masculine given names
English-language masculine given names
Scottish Gaelic masculine given names